Leimbach is a river of Baden-Württemberg, Germany. It passes through Wiesloch and Schwetzingen, and flows into the Rhine in Brühl.

Between the cities of Wiesloch and Walldorf the river flows through the Leimbach Park linear-park close to Wiesloch-Walldorf station before flowing northwards between the Mannheim–Karlsruhe–Basel railway and Wiesloch Feldbahn and Industrial Museum.

See also
List of rivers of Baden-Württemberg

References

Rivers of Baden-Württemberg
Rivers of Germany